Juan Ramón Silva (born 30 August 1948) was a professional footballer with Uruguayan club C.A. Peñarol and was part of the Uruguayan Squad at the World Cup in Germany in 1974. He played as a forward.

References

1948 births
Living people
Uruguayan footballers
Uruguay international footballers
1974 FIFA World Cup players
Uruguayan Primera División players
Peñarol players
S.D. Aucas managers
Association football forwards
Uruguayan football managers
C.D. Universidad Católica del Ecuador managers